Romain Girouille (born 26 April 1988 in Saint-Doulchard) is an athlete from France who competes in archery.

2008 Summer Olympics 
At the 2008 Summer Olympics in Beijing Girouille finished his ranking round with a total of 641 points, which gave him the 51st seed for the final competition bracket in which he faced Sky Kim in the first round. Kim won the match by 112–110 and Girouille was eliminated. Kim would lose in the next round against Jacek Proć.

On 5 April 2009 Girouille defeated Canadian Crispin Duenas in the final of the first round of the 2009 World Cup by a score of 112–107.  He qualified for the final, and finished third.

2012 Summer Olympics 
At the 2012 Summer Olympics, Girouille competed in both the men's individual and men's team events.  In the individual event, he finished in 9th after the ranking round, before losing to Nay Myo Aung in the first knockout round.  The French team made it to the quarterfinals of the team event.

References

External links
 

1988 births
Living people
French male archers
Archers at the 2008 Summer Olympics
Archers at the 2012 Summer Olympics
Olympic archers of France
Sportspeople from Cher (department)
Mediterranean Games silver medalists for France
Mediterranean Games medalists in archery
Competitors at the 2005 Mediterranean Games
21st-century French people